John Ternus is Apple's senior vice president of hardware engineering, reporting to CEO Tim Cook. Ternus leads the Mac, iPhone, iPad, iPod, Apple TV, HomePod, AirPods and Apple Watch engineering teams, which have produced many products.

Biography
Ternus received a Bachelor of Science in Engineering with a major in mechanical engineering from the University of Pennsylvania in 1997.

He joined Apple in 2001 as a member of the product design team. He has transitioned to the role of vice president of hardware engineering in 2013. Since joining Apple, Ternus has presented new Mac and iPad hardware at WWDCs, revealing refreshes of the iMac and MacBook Pro, the new 2018 iPad Pros, and the iMac Pro and the completely redesigned 2019 Mac Pro. He also revealed the 2020 M1 MacBook Air, MacBook Pro, and Mac mini.

He was promoted to the role of senior vice president of hardware engineering on January 25, 2021, replacing Dan Riccio.

He introduced the 2021 24” iMac at the Apple April 2021 event. At Apple’s “Unleashed” event, he unveiled the 2021 MacBook Pros.

References 

Apple Inc. executives
American technology chief executives
University of Pennsylvania alumni
Living people
Year of birth missing (living people)